João Pessanha (born 8 April 1918) was a Portuguese fencer. He competed in the individual and team sabre events at the 1952 Summer Olympics.

References

External links
 

1918 births
Possibly living people
Portuguese male sabre fencers
Olympic fencers of Portugal
Fencers at the 1952 Summer Olympics